Virgilio Vicera (born 3 March 1974) is a Filipino boxer. He competed in the men's bantamweight event at the 1996 Summer Olympics.

References

External links
 

1974 births
Living people
Filipino male boxers
Olympic boxers of the Philippines
Boxers at the 1996 Summer Olympics
People from Negros Occidental
Bantamweight boxers